, in the Hōeidō edition (1833–1834), is a series of ukiyo-e woodcut prints created by Utagawa Hiroshige after his first travel along the Tōkaidō in 1832.

The Tōkaidō road, linking the shōguns capital, Edo, to the imperial one, Kyōto, was the main travel and transport artery of old Japan. It is also the most important of the "Five Roads" (Gokaidō)—the five major roads of Japan created or developed during the Edo period to further strengthen the control of the central shogunate administration over the whole country.

Even though the Hōeidō edition is by far the best known, The Fifty-Three Stations of the Tōkaidō was such a popular subject that it led Hiroshige to create some 30 different series of woodcut prints on it, all very different one from the other by their size (ōban or chuban), their designs or even their number (some series include just a few prints). 
 
The Hōeidō edition of the Tōkaidō is Hiroshige's best known work, and the best sold ever ukiyo-e Japanese prints. Coming just after Hokusai's Thirty-six Views of Mount Fuji series, it established this new major theme of ukiyo-e, the landscape print, or fūkei-ga, with a special focus on "famous views".

The Tōkaidō

The Tōkaidō was one of the Five Routes constructed under Tokugawa Ieyasu, a series of roads linking the historical capital of Edo with the rest of Japan. The Tōkaidō connected Edo with the then-capital of Kyoto. The most important and well-traveled of these, the Tōkaidō travelled along the eastern coast of Honshū, thus giving rise to the name Tōkaidō ("Eastern Sea Road"). Along this road, there were 53 different post stations, which provided stables, food, and lodging for travelers.

Hiroshige and the Tōkaidō

In 1832, Hiroshige traveled the length of the Tōkaidō from Edo to Kyoto, as part of an official delegation transporting horses that were to be presented to the imperial court. The horses were a symbolic gift from the shōgun, presented annually in recognition of the emperor's divine status.

The landscapes of the journey made a profound impression on the artist, and he created numerous sketches during the course of the trip, as well as his return to Edo via the same route. After his arrival at home, he immediately began work on the first prints from The Fifty-Three Stations of the Tōkaidō. Eventually, he would produce 55 prints in the whole series: one for each station, plus one apiece for the starting and ending points. But whether he actually visited all the stations and depicted them from his view is subject to academic debate, as some elements in his woodblock prints have been found to actually borrow directly from other works such as the Tōkaidō meisho zue (東海道名所図会) from 1797. An example is the view of the station Ishibe „Megawa Village“ which is almost identical to the view in the Tōkaidō meisho zue.

The first of the prints in the series was published jointly by the publishing houses of Hōeidō and Senkakudō, with the former handling all subsequent releases on its own. Woodcuts of this style commonly sold as new for between 12 and 16 copper coins apiece, approximately the same price as a pair of straw sandals or a bowl of soup. The runaway success of The Fifty-Three Stations of the Tōkaidō established Hiroshige as the most prominent and successful printmaker of the Tokugawa era.

Hiroshige followed up on this series with The Sixty-nine Stations of the Kiso Kaidō in cooperation with Keisai Eisen, documenting each of the post stations of the Nakasendō (which was alternatively referred to as the Kiso Kaidō).

The Fifty-three Stations of the Tōkaidō (Hōeidō edition) 
The Hōeidō edition is properly titled . Besides the fifty-three stations themselves, the series includes one print for the departure, Nihonbashi (the bridge of Japan),  and a final one, the 55th print, Keishi, Kyoto, the imperial capital.

Historical impact

In 1850, Utagawa Kuniyoshi created his woodblock print inspired by the Hiroshige's, called Cats Suggested As The Fifty-three Stations of the Tōkaidō. Unlike Hiroshige, Kuniyoshi showed every station not with a landscape, but with "cat puns".

During his time in Paris, Vincent van Gogh was an avid collector of ukiyo-e, amassing with his brother a collection of several hundred prints purchased in the gallery of S. Bing. This collection included works from The Fifty-Three Stations of the Tōkaidō, and Van Gogh incorporated stylistic elements from his collection into his own work, such as  bright colors, natural details, and unconventional perspectives. In his personal correspondence, he stated, "all of my work is founded on Japanese art", and described the Impressionists as "the Japanese of France".

Architect Frank Lloyd Wright was an enthusiastic collector of Hiroshige's prints, including those of The Fifty-Three Stations of the Tōkaidō. In 1906, he staged the first ever retrospective of Hiroshige's work at the Art Institute of Chicago, describing them in the exhibition catalog as some of "the most valuable contributions ever made to the art of the world". Two years later, he contributed elements of his collection to another exhibition of ukiyo-e at the Art Institute. Wright also designed the gallery space of the exhibit, which at that time was the largest display of its kind in history. Appreciating the prints on a professional level as well as an aesthetic one, Wright mined his prints for insights into the nature of designing structures, modifying damaged prints by adding lines and shadow in an effort to understand their operating principles.

Hiroshige's Tokaidō prints have since been referenced in popular culture. Weezer's 1996 album Pinkerton, for example, uses Kanbara as its cover art.

In 2012, British contemporary artist Carl Randall created paintings of the people and places along the contemporary Tokaido Highway, walking in the footsteps of the Japanese ukiyo-e printmaker Andō Hiroshige. The project resulted in a group of 15 paintings exhibited at the National Portrait Gallery in London as part of The 2013 BP Portrait Award exhibition, under the title "In the Footsteps of Hiroshige - The Tokaido Highway and Portraits of Modern Japan". The exhibition subsequently toured to The Aberdeen Art Gallery Scotland, and then formed his solo exhibition in Japan ‘Portraits from Edo to the Present’ at The Shizuoka City Tokaido Hiroshige Museum, where the paintings were exhibited alongside Hiroshige's original The Fifty-three Stations of the Tōkaidō woodblock prints.

See also

The Sixty-nine Stations of the Kiso Kaidō by Hiroshige

Notes

References

External links 
 Different editions of the series The Fifty-three Stations of the Tokaido Road (hiroshige.org.uk)
 Wright's Tokaido — FLLW's annotated Hiroshige album — documentary at hiroshige.org.uk

53 stations